was a Japanese actor.

Biography
Shinsui's ex-wife was Midori Hagio. His older brother was director and actor Ryusaku Shinsui.

Shinsui once belonged to Tokyo Kid Brothers. After he left that, he launched the theatrical troupe Mr. Slim Company in 1975.

On 1978, he debuted in Nikkatsu's Roman Porno film, Jokōsei Tenshi no Harawata, which was scripted his brother. Shinsui appeared in many film noir.

He regularly acted in films by Shohei Imamura such as The Ballad of Narayama, Black Rain, and The Eel.

Filmography

Dramas

NHK

Nippon TV

Tokyo Broadcasting System

Fuji Television

TV Asahi

TV Tokyo

Films

Direct-to-video

Albums

Variety series

References

External links
 

1947 births
2017 deaths
Japanese male actors
People from Kumamoto Prefecture